Alexander River may refer to:

 Alexander River (Western Australia) 
 Alexander River (New Zealand)

See also
 Alexander Creek (Susitna River tributary), Alaska
 River Alexander, an American child actor